Abdulla Qahhor (sometimes spelled Abdulla Kahhar in English) (September 17, 1907 – May 24, 1968) was a Soviet and Uzbek novelist, short story writer, poet, playwright, and literary translator. He is best remembered as the author of the 1951 novel Qoʻshchinor chiroqlari (The Lights of Qoʻshchinor) and the 1958 story Sinchalak.

Qahhor is considered to be one of the best Uzbek writers of the 20th century, and has been called the "Chekhov" of Uzbeks. He received the prestigious Stalin Prize in 1952, and a National Writer of the Uzbek SSR award in 1967. In 2000, Qahhor was posthumously awarded the National Order of Merit, one of independent Uzbekistan's most prestigious awards.

Life
Abdulla Qahhor was born on September 17, 1907, in Kokand. His father was a blacksmith and moved from place to place for work. Qahhor attended several schools in Kokand and other nearby villages. From 1922 to 1924, he attended a vocational school in Kokand which specialized in training school teachers. In 1926, Qahhor completed a university preparatory program at Samarkand State University. In 1930, he graduated from Central Asian State University with a degree in pedagogy. From 1933 to 1935, Qahhor was a graduate student at the Institute of Language and Literature in Tashkent. He died in Moscow on May 24, 1968, at the age of 60.

Works

Abdulla Qahhor started his writing career in 1924 by writing short stories for different periodicals, such as Qizil Oʻzbekiston (Red Uzbekistan), Mushtum (Fist), Yangi yoʻl (New Road) under the pen names Nish, Norin Shilpiq, Mavlono Kufur, Guluyor, Erkaboy, and E-boy. His first poem, Oy kuyganda (When the Moon Burned), was published in Mushtum in 1924. Following the release of his first story, Boshsiz odam (The Headless Man) (1929), Qahhor concentrated on prose writing. His first book, Qishloq hukmi ostida (Under the Rule of the Village), was published in 1932. His first collection of stories, Olam yasharadi (The World Becomes Young), was published in 1935.

Qahhor's stories Asror bobo (Grandpa Asror), Dardaqdan chiqqan qahramon (A Hero from Dardaq), Kampirlar sim qoqdi (Old Women Rang), Xotinlar (Women), and Oltin yulduz (The Golden Star) depict the courage of Uzbek soldiers and the hard work of Uzbek workers during the Soviet-German war against Nazi Germany and its allies.

Qahhor's other novels and stories include Sarob (Mirage) (1935), Oʻgʻri (The Thief) (1936), Bemor (The Patient) (1936), Qoʻshchinor chiroqlari (The Lights of Qoʻshchinor) (1951), Oʻtmishdan ertaklar (Stories from the Past) (1965), Muhabbat (Love) (1968), Mahalla, Millatchilar (Nationalists), and others. He is also known for his plays Shohi soʻzana (Silk Suzani) (1950), Ogʻriq tishlar (Hurting Teeth) (1950), Tobutdan tovush (A Sound from the Coffin) (1962), and Ayajonlarim (My Dear Mothers) (1967).

He translated the works of many Russian writers, such as Alexander Pushkin, Anton Chekhov, and Nikolai Gogol into the Uzbek language. In particular, he translated The Captain's Daughter of Pushkin, Marriage and The Government Inspector of Gogol, and, together with his wife Kibriyo Qahhorova, War and Peace of Leo Tolstoy.

Influence
Qahhor influenced numerous Uzbek writers, including Said Ahmad, Oʻtkir Hoshimov, and Erkin Vohidov.

References

External links
The website of the Abdulla Qahhor Museum in Tashkent

1907 births
1968 deaths
20th-century dramatists and playwrights
20th-century male writers
20th-century novelists
20th-century short story writers
20th-century translators
20th-century Uzbekistani writers
People from Kokand
People from Fergana Oblast
Communist Party of the Soviet Union members
National University of Uzbekistan alumni
Stalin Prize winners
Recipients of the Order of the Red Banner of Labour
Socialist realism writers
Translators from Russian
Translators to Uzbek
Uzbeks
Soviet dramatists and playwrights
Soviet male writers
Soviet novelists
Soviet short story writers
Soviet translators
Uzbekistani male writers
Uzbekistani male short story writers
Uzbekistani novelists
Uzbekistani translators